Asian witchcraft  refers to any or all types of witchcraft practiced in Asia.

Middle East

Ancient Near East

The belief in magic and its practice seem to have been widespread in the past. Both in ancient Egypt and in Babylonia it played a conspicuous part, as existing records plainly show. It will be sufficient to quote a short section from the Code of Hammurabi (about 2000 BC).
{{quote|If a man has put a spell upon another man and it is not justified, he upon whom the spell is laid shall go to the holy river; into the holy river shall he plunge. If the holy river overcome him and he is drowned, the man who put the spell upon him shall take possession of his house. If the holy river declares him innocent and he remains unharmed the man who laid the spell shall be put to death. He that plunged into the river shall take possession of the house of him who laid the spell upon him.}}

Torah

In the Tanakh, references to witchcraft are frequent, and the strong condemnations of such practices which we read there do not seem to be based so much upon the supposition of fraud as upon the "abomination" of belief in the magic in itself.

Verses such as Book of Deuteronomy 18:11-12 and Book of Exodus 22:18 "Thou shalt not suffer a witch to live" provided scriptural justification for Christian witch-hunters in the early modern period. The word "witch" is a translation of the Hebrew  kashaf, "sorcerer". The Hebrew Bible provides some evidence that these commandments were enforced under the Hebrew kings:

The Hebrew verb , translated in the King James Version as "cut off", can also be translated as "kill wholesale" or "exterminate".

New Testament

The New Testament condemns the practice as an abomination, just as the Old Testament had (Epistle to the Galatians 5:20, compared with the Book of Revelation 21:8; 22:15; and Acts of the Apostles 8:9; 13:6).

There is some debate, however, as to whether the word used in Galatians and Revelation,  pharmakeía, is properly translated as "sorcery", as the word was commonly used to describe the malicious use of drugs.

Islam
Divination and magic in Islam encompass a wide range of practices, including black magic, warding off the evil eye, the production of amulets and other magical equipment, evocation, cleromancy, astrology and physiognomy.

Muslims, followers of the religion of Islam, do commonly believe in the existence of magic and black magic (sihr), and explicitly forbid the practice of it. Sihr is the word for "black magic" in Arabic. The best known reference to magic in Islam is in surah al-Falaq, which is a prayer to ward off black magic.

Many Muslims believe that a person taught black magic to mankind:

However, whereas performing miracles or good magic in Islamic thought is from Messengers (al-Rusul – those who came with a new revealed text) and Prophets (al-anbiya – those who came to continue the specific law and Revelation of a previous Messenger); supernatural acts are also believed to be performed by awliya – the spiritually accomplished, through ma'rifa – and referred to as karamat "extraordinary acts". Disbelief in the miracles of the Prophets is considered an act of disbelief; belief in the miracles of any given pious individual is not. Neither are regarded as magic, but as signs of Allah at the hands of those close to him that occur by his will and his alone.

It is Haram/prohibited for Muslims to engage help of the jin as Islam is strictly monotheistic. Seeking aid other than from Allah is shirk. Deviant practitioners commonly seek the help of the jinn in magic (singular jinni). It is a common belief that jinns can possess a human, thus requiring exorcism. (The belief in jinn in general is part of the Muslim faith. Muslim ibn al-Hajjaj narrated the Prophet said: "Allah created the angels from light, created the jinn from the pure flame of fire, and Adam from that which was described to you (i.e., the clay.)")

Students of the history of religion have linked several magical practices in Islam with pre-Islamic Turkish and East African customs. Most notable of these customs is the zar.Magic and Divination in Early Islam (The Formation of the Classical Islamic World) by Emilie Savage-Smith (Ed.), Ashgate Publishing 2004

Judaism
Jewish law views the practice of witchcraft as being laden with idolatry and/or necromancy; both being serious theological and practical offenses in Judaism. According to Traditional Jewish sources, it is acknowledged that while magic exists, it is forbidden to practice it on the basis that it usually involves the worship of other gods. Rabbis of the Talmud also condemned magic when it produced something other than illusion, giving the example of two men who use magic to pick cucumbers (Sanhedrin 67a). The one who creates the illusion of picking cucumbers should not be condemned, only the one who actually picks the cucumbers through magic. However, some of the Rabbis practiced "magic" themselves. For instance, Rabbah created a person and sent him to Rabbi Zera, and Rabbi Hanina and Rabbi Oshaia studied every Sabbath evening together and created a small calf to eat (Sanhedrin 65b). In these cases, the "magic" was seen more as divine miracles (i.e., coming from God rather than pagan gods) than as witchcraft.

 Nepal 
In Nepal, women are often accused of witchcraft and thus suffer the abuse at the hands of people from their own communities. Nepali people view witchcraft as harmful to society and it still exists in most of the country. However, it is most prevalent in the Terai and hilly rural regions and women here are more vulnerable to abuse. Women of all ages and social statuses can be targeted and once a woman has been deemed a witch, she is treated horribly by society. The witches are called ‘Boksi’ in Nepali language and it’s believed that they learn witchcraft from their mothers.

Punishment can range from receiving severe beatings with sticks or other blunt object to being forced to consume human excreta, a common practice in the plains area of Nepal. Women who are accused of witchcraft may be marked with soot on their faces or garlands of shoes around their necks. These traumatized women are forced to endure mental and physical torture that can lead to ostracization, emotional disturbance and even death.

In Terhathum, there is a rock called ‘boksimara’ which translates to “witch killer stone”. It is said that 200 years ago, accused women were taken to boksimara to be hanged from its precipice. To this day, these types of outdated customs and traditions continue to be prevalent among various castes and tribes. Laxmi Maya Nepali, a victim and inhabitant of Shrijung Village Development committee from Terhathum expresses her pain of being accused of being a witch:"I had to stay alone in an old house, it was difficult to move around for me, people used to call me witch; even my own relatives did not let me stay at home    accusing me of being a witch. One of my relatives gave birth to a dead baby and they accused me as their baby was dead because of my witchcraft powers. Even my son was badly beaten by his own nephew.”The atrocities that these women face can also prevent them from equal access to education. Without the tools to succeed academically, the accused women are not able to change their societal status. The traditional ways and superstitious beliefs of Nepali culture trap accused women in a vicious cycle. This continues as they are denied opportunities to educate themselves and they are forced to suffer, oftentimes in poverty, for the rest of their lives.

The legal system has done nothing to address the horrors that Nepali women suffer to this day if they are accused of witchcraft. The state has not formulated any concrete law regarding the “crime of witchcraft”. The Nepali legal system also does not have provisions to punish individuals who have been involved in witch-hunts. If an individual has a complaint filed against them and they are found guilty, they are only imprisoned for a short period of time and may walk away with a fine. Section 10 of Muluki Ain or the National Civil Code states that if a person makes an accusation of witchcraft, they shall be jailed for three months to two years or fined five thousand to twenty-five thousand Nepalese Rupees or both. This is the only punishment for those who would commit atrocities against innocent women.

India

Belief in the supernatural is strong in certain parts of India, and lynchings for witchcraft are reported in the press from time to time. According to the Indian National Crime Records Bureau, at least 2100 suspected witches (known as dayan) were murdered between 2000 and 2012. It is believed that an average of over 150 women per year are killed accused of being witches, concentrated across central India. Murder is commonly carried out by means of being burned, hacked or bludgeoned to death, often preceded by ritual humiliation, such as being stripped naked, smeared with filth and forced to eat excrement. For those accused of witchcraft who are not murdered, nearly all suffer permanent ostracism or banishment and their families face social stigma.

ChinaGong Tau in Hokkien, Teochew in Cantonese or Jiang Tou in Mandarin is the term used when someone is suspected of having been attacked by black magic and is believed to be a fusion of poison skills which originated in Yunnan, China and witchcraft seen in South East Asia. It is used to either seek revenge, resolve relationship issues or even to assist with money problems.

Japan
In Japanese folklore the witch can commonly be separated into two categories: those who employ snakes as familiars, and those who employ foxes.

Fox employers

The fox witch is by far the most commonly seen witch figure in Japan. Differing regional beliefs set those who use foxes into two separate types: the kitsune-tsukai, and the kitsune-mochi.

The first of these, the kitsune-tsukai, gains his fox familiar by bribing it with its favourite foods. The kitsune-tsukai then strikes up a deal with the fox, typically promising food and daily care in return for the fox's magical services. The fox of Japanese folklore is a powerful trickster, imbued with powers of shape changing, possession, and illusion. These creatures can be either nefarious; disguising themselves as women in order to trap men, or they can be benign forces as in the story of 'The Grateful Foxes'. However, once a fox enters the employ of a man it almost exclusively becomes a force of evil to be feared.

A fox under the employ of a human can provide him with many services. The fox can turn invisible and be set out to find secrets and it still retains its many powers of illusion which its master will often put to use in order to trick his enemies. The most feared power the kitsune-tsukai'' possesses is his ability to command his fox to possess other humans.

In popular culture
Magical girl genre may be the most commonly known to feature witchcraft, but it appears liberally in any works of fiction where such supernatural power can exist, despite the fact that such magic resembles more of western witchcraft than an oriental counterpart. Evil witch antagonists, borne out of the European concept of witch, are popular; however, their powers rarely stem from worshipping devils.

Magical girl animation is typically referred to as mahō shōjo and majokko anime in Japan and the target audience is intended for female prepubescent viewers. The protagonists of these anime are normal schoolgirls who suddenly happen across a mystical item that transforms them into super-beings who have magical abilities. Despite the repetitive story lines that are supposed to be aimed at children, the magical girl genre brings attention to the surrounding gender roles and identities. Some argue that the magical girl genre is empowering for young audiences as the characters become superheroes who take down the bad guys. However, other theories accuse the magical girl anime of depicting an abundance of eroticism and violence.

Toei Studio produced the first heroine anime which was also the first magical girl anime, Sally the Witch. The settings and character elements were heavily borrowed from many live-action television programs which included the American comedy, Bewitched. While the concept of witches waned in the United States, the symbolism of magic and witchcraft translated well into Japanese culture.

Korea
Attempting to influence others through spells in Joseon was widely censured by the royal court. On discovering that Consort Hwi-bin Kim had used witchcraft on the crown prince, Sejong the Great described her as a "sorcerer" or "evil monster" and had her thrown out of the palace.

Philippines 

Philippine witches are the users of black magic and related practices from the Philippines. They include a variety of different kinds of people with differing occupations and cultural connotations which depend on the ethnic group they are associated with. They are completely different from the Western notion of what a witch is, as each ethnic group has their own definition and practices attributed to witches. The curses and other magics of witches are often blocked, countered, cured, or lifted by Philippine shamans associated with the indigenous Philippine folk religions.

Central Asia
Witchcraft is a feature of traditional mythology in Kazakhstan and Tajikistan documented since the 16th century.  It is believed that once a human dies their soul is owned by the witch that murdered them.

References

Asian society
Asian witchcraft